Coastal Carolina Community College is a public community college in Jacksonville, North Carolina. Roughly eight thousand students are enrolled at the institution. It is part of the North Carolina Community College System and a satellite school of the University of North Carolina at Wilmington. The school's athletic program is known as the Cougars.

External links

 

North Carolina Community College System colleges
Universities and colleges accredited by the Southern Association of Colleges and Schools
Education in Onslow County, North Carolina
Buildings and structures in Onslow County, North Carolina
Two-year colleges in the United States